The 1914 – 1918 Fire Cross was a Belgian military decoration awarded to all holders of the so-called "Fire Card" which was awarded to all who came under fire at the front during the First World War.  The medal was established by royal decree on 6 February 1934.  It could not be awarded posthumously.

Award description

The Fire Cross was a 44 mm wide by 54 mm high (including ribbon loop) bronze cross quadrate.  Except for a 3 mm wide plain border, the cross arms were striated, horizontally for the lateral arms and vertically for the vertical arms on both the obverse and reverse.  The 30 mm wide by 37 mm high central rectangle bore on its obverse, 5mm wide vertical laurel branches on either side, at center, the relief image of a deserted battlefield with at the forefront, the relief image of a World War 1 Belgian helmet over a bayonet, farther and on a slight elevation at left, a 75 mm howitzer, at upper right, the Sun breaking through clouds.  On its reverse, a large laurel branch extending diagonally from bottom left to top right and bisected by the relief inscription on two lines in Latin "SALUS PATRIAE SUPREMA LEX" roughly translating into "THE NATION'S SALVATION IS OUR HIGHEST DUTY".  In the top left corner, a royal crown from which seven relief rays extend downwards, at bottom right, the relief years on two rows "1914" and "1918", at bottom left just below the laurel branch's stem, the name of the awards designer, "A. Rombaut".

The cross hangs from a 36mm wide red silk moiré ribbon with three 4 mm wide longitudinal blue stripes, one at centre, the other two on either side 1 mm from the ribbon's edges.

Notable recipients (partial list)
The individuals listed below were awarded the Fire Cross:
Aviator Lieutenant Colonel Baron Willy Coppens
Lieutenant General Alphonse Ferdinand Tromme
Major General Maurice Jacmart
Lieutenant General Jean-Baptiste Piron
Lieutenant General Jules Joseph Pire
Cavalry Lieutenant General Sir Maximilien de Neve de Roden
Cavalry Lieutenant General Baron Victor Van Strijdonck de Burkel
Lieutenant General Georges Deffontaine
Lieutenant General Alphonse Verstraete
Lieutenant General Baron Raoul de Hennin de Boussu-Walcourt
Lieutenant General Joseph Leroy
Cavalry Lieutenant General Jules De Boeck
Lieutenant General Fernand Vanderhaeghen
Lieutenant General Robert Oor
Lieutenant General Libert Elie Thomas
Lieutenant General Léon Bievez
Cavalry Major General Baron Beaudoin de Maere d’Aertrycke
Major General Paul Jacques
Chaplain General Louis Kerremans
Lieutenant General Baron Armand de Ceuninck
Lieutenant General Aloïs Biebuyck
Cavalry Lieutenant General Vicount Victor Buffin de Chosal
Lieutenant General Doctor Edmond François Durré
Baron Joseph van der Elst
Governor Jacques Delvaux de Fenffe

See also

 List of Orders, Decorations and Medals of the Kingdom of Belgium

References

Other sources
 Quinot H., 1950, Recueil illustré des décorations belges et congolaises, 4e Edition. (Hasselt)
 Cornet R., 1982, Recueil des dispositions légales et réglementaires régissant les ordres nationaux belges. 2e Ed. N.pl.,  (Brussels)
 Borné A.C., 1985, Distinctions honorifiques de la Belgique, 1830–1985 (Brussels)

External links
Les Ordres Nationaux Belges (In French)
Bibliothèque royale de Belgique  (In French)
ARS MORIENDI Notables from Belgian history  (In French and Dutch)

1934 establishments in Belgium
Military awards and decorations of Belgium
Awards established in 1934